Marina Erakovic and Heather Watson were the defending champions but decided not to participate. 
Raquel Kops-Jones and Abigail Spears won the title, defeating Julia Görges and Darija Jurak in the final, 6-2, 7–6(7–4).

Seeds

Draw

Draw

References
 Main draw

Bank of the West Classic - Doubles
2013 Doubles